Taractrocera dolon, the sandy grass-dart, is a butterfly of the family Hesperiidae. It is found in Australia in the Northern Territory, Queensland and New South Wales as well as Papua New Guinea.

The wingspan is about 20 mm.

The larvae feed on Sorghum verticilliflorum.

Subspecies
Taractrocera dolon diomedes Waterhouse, 1933 (Northern Territory)
Taractrocera dolon dolon (Plötz, 1884)  (New South Wales, Queensland, Papua New Guinea, Louisiade Archipelago)

External links
Australian Insects
Australian Faunal Directory

Taractrocerini
Butterflies described in 1884